The inaugural Commonwealth Sailing Championships were held in Port Phillip, Melbourne in January 2003.  Both the Commonwealth Games Federation and the International Sailing Federation (ISAF) approved the Inaugural Commonwealth Sailing Championships. The Championship venue was the Sandringham Yacht Club, which has also hosted the ISAF Grade 1 event (the Olympic & Invited Classes Regatta).

Classes
The classes of competition were:
 Laser (men)
 Laser Radial (women)
 470 (men)
 470 (women)
 Mistral (men)
 Mistral (women)
 Hobie 16 (open)

Results

Men's events

Women's events

Open events

Medal table

References

External links
 Sail Melbourne website

Sailing
Sports competitions in Melbourne
Sailing competitions in Australia
2003 in sailing
2003 in Australian sport
International sports competitions hosted by Australia